Digamber Singh (1 October 1951 - 27 October 2017) was a Bharatiya Janata Party leader. He served as cabinet minister in the Government of India. He represented Deeg-Kumher Assembly constituency of Bharatpur district in the Rajasthan Legislative Assembly. Served in Government Medical Department until 1992. He was first elected to assembly in 1993. He served first as Minister of Health, Ayurveda & Family Welfare and later from 2009 onwards as Industries Minister. He was Chairman of the "Bees Sutri Karyakram" or the "Twenty Point Programme" and held a Cabinet Minister status. He was later appointed the Minister in-charge for "Four Important Schemes of Rajasthan" including health, social justice, law and rural development.

Political career 

Singh joined the Bharatiya Janta Party in late 1980s. He was the Bharatpur district President of the Bharatiya Janta Party in the early 1990s. He was first elected to the Rajasthan Legislative Assembly in 1993 from Kumher in Bharatpur at the age of 43. He later fought, and lost in the 1996 general election to Natwar Singh. He was re-elected in 1998 as a Member of the Legislative Assembly (MLA). He went on to win the 2003 Rajasthan election from Kumher and was further appointed Cabinet Minister of Health & FW in Government of Rajasathan under the leadership of Vasundhara Raje. He was appointed as the Cabinet Minister Of Industries in 2009. Singh then won the 2008 election for the fourth consecutive time from Deeg-Kumher, defeating Vishvendra Singh. Singh served as an MLA, after the Bharatiya Janta Party was voted out of power. Singh lost the 2013 elections. The Bharatiya Janta Party was voted back to power and Chief Minister Vasundhara Raje sought Singh in the Cabinet. Therefore Singh was asked to contest the bypoll from Surajgarh, Jhunjhunu.

References

1951 births
2017 deaths
Rajasthan MLAs 2003–2008
People from Bharatpur district
State cabinet ministers of Rajasthan
Bharatiya Janata Party politicians from Rajasthan